Oromocto-Lincoln-Fredericton is a provincial electoral district for the Legislative Assembly of New Brunswick, Canada.  It was first contested in the 2014 general election, having been created in the 2013 redistribution of electoral boundaries from portions of the former ridings of Oromocto and Fredericton-Lincoln.

The district includes all of the Town of Oromocto, the unincorporated community of Lincoln and CFB Gagetown, as well as a significant portion of the City of Fredericton.  The riding was named Oromocto-Lincoln from 2014 to 2017 until it was renamed to recognize the significant portion of Fredericton contained in the riding.

Members of the Legislative Assembly

Election results

References

External links 
Website of the Legislative Assembly of New Brunswick

New Brunswick provincial electoral districts